Jaroměřice is a municipality and village in Svitavy District in the Pardubice Region of the Czech Republic. It has about 1,200 inhabitants.

Administrative parts
The village of Nový Dvůr is an administrative part of Jaroměřice.

Gallery

References

Villages in Svitavy District